The Jets is the debut studio album by Tongan-American family band The Jets, released on October 14th, 1985, by MCA Records.

The Jets gained airplay on MTV, VH1 and BET with the release of their first single "Curiosity". The song reached number 8 on the R&B chart.

The second single "Crush on You" would become the Jets' most successful single. It was their first song to chart on the Billboard Hot 100. The song reached number 3 on the Pop chart and number 4 on the R&B chart. It stayed in the top 5 for 6 weeks.

The third single "Private Number" was a moderate hit for the Jets, reaching number 47 on the Pop chart and number 28 on the R&B chart.

The fourth and final single was the ballad "You Got It All". It reached number 3 on the Pop chart and number 2 on the R&B chart, and managed to reach number 1 on the Adult Contemporary chart also. It still gains occasional airplay on radio stations in the U.S.

The album would go on to reach number 17 in the U.S. and be certified Platinum.

Track listing
"Curiosity" – 4:58 (Jerry Knight, Aaron Zigman) Lead Vocal: Elizabeth
"Crush on You" – 4:28 (Jerry Knight, Aaron Zigman) Lead Vocal: Elizabeth
"You Got It All" – 4:05 (Rupert Holmes) Lead Vocal: Elizabeth
"Love Umbrella" – 4:33 (Jerry Knight, Aaron Zigman) Lead Vocal: Eugene
"Private Number" – 4:03 (Jerry Knight, Aaron Zigman) Lead Vocal: Elizabeth
"Heart on the Line" – 3:34 (Jerry Knight, Aaron Zigman) Lead Vocal: Eugene
"Right Before My Eyes" – 3:49 (Jerry Knight, Aaron Zigman) Lead Vocal: Rudy, Eugene
"La-La (Means I Love You)" – 3:48 (Thom Bell, William Hart) Lead Vocal: Elizabeth, Rudy
"Mesmerized" – 4:17 (Jerry Knight, Aaron Zigman) Lead Vocal: Eugene

Personnel
 Elizabeth Wolfgramm – vocals, keyboards, percussion
 Moana Wolfgramm – vocals, keyboards, percussion
 Eugene Wolfgramm – vocals, percussion, alto saxophone
 Leroy Wolfgramm – electric guitars
 Haini Wolfgramm – bass
 Kathi Wolfgramm – keyboards
 Eddie Wolfgramm – tenor saxophone, percussion
 Rudy Wolfgramm – vocals, drums

Charts

Weekly charts

Year-end charts

References

The Jets (band) albums
1985 debut albums
MCA Records albums